Bamse is a Swedish cartoon bear.

Bamse or BAMSE may also refer to:
 
 Bamse (dog), a Norwegian dog
 Flemming "Bamse" Jørgensen (1947–2011), Danish singer
 RBS 23 BAMSE, a Swedish anti-aircraft missile system